Yarm Viaduct carries railway traffic above the town of Yarm and across the River Tees straddling the boundary between North Yorkshire and County Durham in northern England. The line and viaduct are currently owned and maintained by Network Rail and carries passenger traffic for TransPennine Express and Grand Central train operating companies. It also sees a variety of freight traffic.

The viaduct consists of 43 arches; 41 of which are made of red brick, with the two arches straddling the water constructed of stone. The viaduct, which is cited for its appearance and height above the town, was grade II listed in 1966.

History
The section of line through Yarm to Eaglescliffe (original Preston) Junction was formally started in July 1847, but work on the viaduct did not commence until 1849.

The structure opened up to traffic on 15 May 1852 and it was the last work completed by Grainger as he died two months later in a railway accident in Stockton-on-Tees. The viaduct is noted for its height above the town of Yarm and is variously described as being "towering", "very beautiful" and "great". One local writer described the viaduct as being "acknowledged as the finest in the kingdom". Due to its height and length, when viewing the town from afar (especially from the west) the viaduct is a dominating structure across the town.

The line that the viaduct is on (Northallerton to Eaglescliffe line) carries passenger services for Grand Central ( to ) and TransPennine Express ( to ) as well as a variety of freight traffic to and from the north east.

The structure was strengthened in some of its spans with extra bricks on the inside of the arches and stabilisation works undertaken in 2001 due to subsidence, lessened the vibrations felt by property owners below the viaduct either significantly or completely.

Structure
It consists of 43 arches; 41 of them are  span and are constructed of 7.5 million red bricks. On the downstream side of the viaduct (eastern side) is a large plaque set into the stone section of where the bridge spans the river. This commemorates the engineers and contractors on the project.

Workers on the structure (navvies) were paid £1 per day with the total cost of the bridge being £44,500 by its completion in 1852 (£5.6 million equivalent in 2016). A system of pulleys worked by teams of horses allowed the raw materials to be brought onto the site.

Incidents
In 1855, when Yarm railway station was at the northern end of the viaduct, a train travelling south overshot the station in the darkness and bad weather. A passenger alighted from a carriage and fell  to his death.
In 1997, a train of ballast became partially derailed in Eaglescliffe as it was heading south. When it travelled over the viaduct, loose ballast from the derailed wagon was thrown  onto the properties below the viaduct.

Notes

References

External links

Images on ncl site
Footage of a freight train transiting the viaduct in 1962 (begins at 28:00)

Crossings of the River Tees
Bridges completed in 1852
Railway viaducts in County Durham
Railway viaducts in North Yorkshire
Buildings and structures in Stockton-on-Tees
Grade II listed buildings in North Yorkshire
Grade II listed bridges
Yarm